Atlético Fútbol Club (or Atlético F.C.), formerly known as Dépor FC is a professional Colombian football team based in Cali, that currently plays in the Categoría Primera B. They play their home games at the Olímpico Pascual Guerrero stadium.

History

Origins as Dépor FC
The club was founded as Deportivo Pereira S.A. in 2005 after the membership rights (ficha) of Real Sincelejo, a club that competed in Categoría Primera B until 2004, were irregularly sold by one of its shareholders to investors from Pereira led by former Senator Habib Merheg who wanted to create a club to claim the license held by Deportivo Pereira and prevent the latter club from folding due to its financial problems. However, Deportivo Pereira were able to continue competing in the league, and the club was sold to its current owner Gustavo Moreno who rebranded it to Dépor FC and moved it to Cartago, Valle del Cauca.

For the following year, the club moved to Jamundí, in the same department. From 2006 to 2008 its home was the Estadio Cacique Jamundí, with a temporary return for 2010 and the first half of the 2011 season due to their home stadium being closed for remodeling works ahead of the 2011 FIFA U-20 World Cup. Its greatest achievement was qualifying for the semifinals for the first and only time in 2008 under the leadership of coach Julio Valdivieso.

Due to financial difficulties and the support offered by Cali's local government as well as public utilities company Emcali, who wished to carry out social work with young people from the Aguablanca District in Cali, the club was renamed to Dépor Aguablanca in 2009 and moved from Jamundí to represent the aforementioned sector, now playing their home games at the Estadio Pascual Guerrero. Since then, the club continued competing in Primera B without remarkable results.

Atlético Fútbol Club
In 2015, after a court ruling declared the sale of Real Sincelejo void, the former shareholders of the Sincelejo club sold it to Juan Carlos Restrepo, stepfather of footballer James Rodríguez, who intended to move the club to Ibagué, rename it to Tolima Real and enter it into the Primera B competition. Although Restrepo argued that he was the legitimate owner of the Real Sincelejo ficha, DIMAYOR refused to admit Tolima Real while at the same time Dépor FC owner Gustavo Moreno founded a new club under the name of Atlético Fútbol Club which with the consent of both DIMAYOR and Coldeportes, replaced Dépor FC in its competitions. Coldeportes withdrew Real Sincelejo's sporting license (reconocimiento deportivo), and thus the one used by Dépor to compete from 2005 until then, in order to allow Atlético F.C. to join DIMAYOR. The club is popularly known as Atlético de Cali or just Atlético.

Due to this controversy, the club was not able to play its first seven matches of the 2016 season, which were going to be awarded as losses by walkover, however they were eventually confirmed to be played after the club was renamed and accepted into the league.

Stadium

Current squad

References

External links
 Official web site
 Atlético F.C. page on DIMAYOR
 official facebook
 official instagram
 twitter

Football clubs in Colombia
Association football clubs established in 2005
2005 establishments in Colombia
Categoría Primera B clubs